Dole pri Škofljici (in older sources also Dolje) is a small settlement in the Municipality of Škofljica in central Slovenia. It lies in a small valley east of Škofljica itself. The municipality is part of the traditional region of Lower Carniola and is now included in the Central Slovenia Statistical Region.

Name
The name of the settlement was changed from Dole to Dole pri Škofljici in 1955.

References

External links

Dole pri Škofljici on Geopedia

Populated places in the Municipality of Škofljica